

Movies 

 Munna Bhai (film series)
 Munna Bhai M.B.B.S.
 Lage Raho Munna Bhai

Peoples 

 Munna Bhai (Fictional Character)
 Munnu Bhai